Nāder's loss of prestige in the Dagestan campaign and his ongoing war with the Ottomans caused several domestic rebellions. The most serious of these began near Shiraz in January 1744 and was led by Moḥammad Taqi Khan Shirazi, the commander of Fārs province and one of Nāder’s favorites. In June 1744, Nāder sacked Shiraz, and by winter he had crushed these revolts with extreme force.

See also
 Afsharid dynasty
 Safavid dynasty
 Shiraz
 Nader Shah

Sources
 Michael Axworthy, The Sword of Persia: Nader Shah, from Tribal Warrior to Conquering Tyrant Hardcover 348 pages (26 July 2006) Publisher: I.B. Tauris  Language: English 

Conflicts in 1744
Battles involving Afsharid Iran